The Mercury program was Project Mercury, the first successful American crewed spaceflight program, 1958–63.

Mercury Program may also refer to:

The Mercury Program, an American post-rock band formed 1997

Other uses
The Mercury Theatre on the Air, radio program
Mercury (TV series), TV program

See also
Mercury project (disambiguation)
Mercury (disambiguation)